The Shire of Cardinia is a local government area in Victoria, Australia, in the south-east of Melbourne between Western Port and the Yarra Ranges on the outskirts of Melbourne. It has an area of 1,283 square kilometres, and had a population of 107,120 in June 2018.

Cardinia Shire Council Offices are located in Officer. Prior to 17 November 2014, they were located in Pakenham.

History
The areas within the present-day boundaries of Cardinia Shire were originally parts of the Cranbourne and Berwick districts, which were incorporated in 1860 and 1862 respectively. The Shire of Fern Tree Gully, later Shire of Sherbrooke, split away in 1889 and included areas to the east of Melbourne. In 1973, the City of Berwick, including Berwick and areas closer to Dandenong, split away from the Shire of Berwick, with the remainder being renamed Shire of Pakenham.

The Shire came into being on 15 December 1994 as the result of statewide local government reform, by merging the Shire of Pakenham with rural sections of the Shire of Sherbrooke and City of Cranbourne.

The Shire of Cardinia contains the only area of Melbourne to use telephone numbers beginning with the exchange prefix 5 - this is a leftover from when it used the area code 059-xx xxxx.

Council
Administration

The Council Offices were originally located in Henty Way, Pakenham. On 17 November 2014, the Council moved to a new office on Siding Avenue, Officer, which it uses presently. The Council holds its meetings and all of the administration staff work there.

Libraries

Cardinia Shire is part of the Casey Cardinia Library Corporation and there are two full-time libraries in Cardinia, in Emerald and Pakenham. In addition, the Mobile Library visits the suburbs of Bunyip, Garfield, Tynong, Beaconsfield, Upper Beaconsfield, Gembrook, Maryknoll, Cockatoo, Lang Lang and Koo Wee Rup.

Wards

The Shire of Cardinia is divided into nine wards: Beacon Hills, Bunyip, Central, Henty, Officer, Pakenham Hills, Ranges, Toomuc and Westenport. Elections are held every four years, each ward has one counciller. Before October 2020 the shire had three wards: Central, Ranges and Port.

Mayors
 2008: Bill Ronald
 2009: Bill Pearson
 2010: Graeme Legge
 2011: George Blenkhorn
 2012: Ed Chatwin
 2013: Brett Owen
 2014: Graeme Moore
 2015: Leticia Wilmot
 2016: Jodie Owen
 2017: Brett Owen
 2018: Collin Ross
 2019: Graeme Moore
 2020: Jeff Springfield
 2021: Brett Owen

Deputy Mayors
 2016: Leticia Wilmot
 2017: Jodie Owen
 2018: Brett Owen
 2019: Collin Ross
 2020: Graeme Moore
 2021: Jeff Springfield

Elected Councillors
The current Council, elected on the 24 October 2020, by ward.

The next council election will be held on 26 October 2024.

Townships and localities
The 2021 census, the shire had a population of 118,194 up from 94,128 in the 2016 census

^ - Territory divided with another LGA

See also 
 List of places on the Victorian Heritage Register in the Shire of Cardinia
 Mornington Peninsula and Western Port Biosphere Reserve

References

External links
 
Cardinia Shire Council official website
Cardinia Shire facts and statistics
Casey Cardinia Libraries
Metlink local public transport map
Link to Land Victoria interactive maps

Local government areas of Melbourne
Greater Melbourne (region)